Nilmini Buwaneka is an actress, dancer and choreographer from Sri Lanka.

Dancing 
She learned dancing in Bhatkhande Music Institute, where she gained a Diploma in Baratha Natyam.

Theater 
Nilmini has portrayed many leading roles for the most thriving directors in the drama and theater field of Sri Lanka, and in many non-commercial stage plays such as: 

Ayeth enne ne - Widows 
Dasa Mallige Bangalawa
Death of a Salesman
Devadasi (Sinhala and English)
Doll’s House
Don Diyego
Hena – Thunder
House of Bernada Alba 
Julius Caesar
Loka
Makarakshaya
Manoramya Gee
Mother Courage 
Reality Show
Seru
Sihina Dakinna
Thatu
Weeraya Merila

Television acting 
Nilmini has acted in a Total of 45 Television serials ranges from drama, thriller to comedy.

Selected television serials

Agamehesiyo
Agni Kankariya
Alu Pata Heena
Ambudaruwo 
 Anne 
 Aparna
Bhava Tharana
Bhavathu Sabba Mangalam
Bumuthurunu
Chandragrahanaya
Chathurya
Dahas Gau Dura
Dhadayakkaraya
Duli Pintharu
Ehi Pillamak Yata
Hiru Daruwo
Ira Awara
Kalpa Kumari
Mandakini
Monarathenna
Nama Veni Kadulla
Parana Tauma
Pura Kalani
Rala Bindena Thena
Sandakinduri
Sansare Piya Satahan (Buddhist drama)
Sansara Prarthana
Sasara Chakra
Sath Piyawaru
Sihina Piyapath
Sihina Puraya
Sirakari
Sitha Nivana Katha (Buddhist drama)
Sithumina
Sonduru Piyapath
Sneha
Suba
Suba Sihina
Sudheera
Sudui Usai
Sura Vimana
Thaksalawa
Udu Sulanga
 Wanabime Sirakaruwo
Wankagiriya

Directing and Choreography
Having had the opportunity to work as an Assistant Director alongside Dharmasiri Bandaranayake a Director who marked an era of movie making in Sri Lanka, Nilmini was praised by foreign critics after seeing her own direction of a stage plays using only children engulfed by Down syndrome. (Sihina Mal Dangakary, Eka Adipathi, Yakshaya, Sathya)

Cinema 
Playing characters in both leading as well as supporting roles in several movies, her distinctiveness remains that of acting only in handpicked special creations of cinema.

Awards
In 2004 she won the State Drama Award Festival(SDAF) for Best Actress in a leading role followed by the award for Best Actress in a Supporting Role at the Sumathi Tele Drama Award Festival in 2008. (State Drama Award for ‘Dasa Mallige Bangalawa’ directed by Ruwan Malith and Sumathi Tele Award for ‘Sudheera’ directed by Benat Rathnayake)

References

External links 

20th-century Sri Lankan actresses
21st-century Sri Lankan actresses
Sri Lankan television actresses
Sri Lankan stage actresses